Comet Spitaler is a periodic comet in the Solar System discovered by Rudolf Ferdinand Spitaler (Vienna, Austria) on November 17, 1890, while attempting to observe Comet Zona (C/1890 V1).

Spitaler, together with G. M. Searle, J. F. Tennant, and J. R. Hind, calculated orbits based on the observations, but despite predictions of a return in 1897, it was lost and remained so for the next few decades.

On October 24, 1993, the comet was rediscovered by J. V. Scotti (Spacewatch, Kitt Peak Observatory, Arizona, United States), it was confirmed as Spitaler's comet when Brian G. Marsden connected the 1890 and 1994 apparitions.

References

External links 
 Orbital simulation from JPL (Java) / Horizons Ephemeris
 113P at Kronk's Cometography
 113P at Kazuo Kinoshita's Comets
 113P at Seiichi Yoshida's Comet Catalog

Periodic comets
0113
Comets in 2015
18901117